Isaac Cruikshank (bapt. 14 October 1764  1811) was a Scottish painter and caricaturist, known for his social and political satire.

Biography
Cruikshank was the son of Andrew Crookshanks ( 1725  c. 1783), a former customs inspector, dispossessed for his role in the Jacobite rising of 1745 originally from Edinburgh, and Elizabeth Davidson (born  1725), the daughter of a gardener. He was born on 5 October 1764 in Edinburgh, where he was baptised on 14 October 1764. Isaac grew up in New North Kirk parish in Edinburgh after his family moved there. He was the youngest child, and was interested in all sorts of hobbies including sports and music. Isaac studied with a local artist, possibly John Kay (17421826).

In 1783, Cruikshank left Scotland to travel to London with his master. There he married Mary MacNaughton (1769–1853) on 14 August 1788. The couple had five known children, two of whom died in infancy. A daughter, Margaret Eliza (18081825), a promising artist, died at the age of eighteen of tuberculosis. Their sons Isaac Robert Cruikshank (17891856), and George Cruikshank (17921878), also became artists.

Cruikshank's first known publications were etchings of Edinburgh "types", from 1784. His first caricature etching called Scotch Eloquence was of Edinburgh characters. He produced illustrations for books about the theatre, did the frontispiece for Witticisms and Jests of Dr. Johnson (1791), and illustrated George Shaw's extensive General Zoology (1800–26). His water colours were exhibited, but in order to make a living, he found it more lucrative to produce prints and caricatures. He was responsive to the marketplace but firm in his dislikes of Napoleon and Britain's home-grown political radicals, including, for example, the members of the London Corresponding Society and the Society of the Friends of the People. He and James Gillray developed the figure of John Bull, the nationalistic representation of a solid British yeoman. His Olympic games or John Bull introducing his new ambassador to the grand consul and Boney at Brussells (both from 1803) contrast an implied European capitulation and British defiance under the threat of invasion.<ref>Napoleonic and Georgian Social and Political Satire', Thursday 25 June 2015, Bloomsbury Auctions, London, 2015.</ref>

Near the start of his fame in 1789, Cruikshank produced several watercolours adapted from his earlier drawings, and was on exhibition at the Royal Academy. Publisher John Roach was a friend and patron. Cruikshank later also worked with print dealer S. W. Fores and Johnny Fairburn. He also collaborated with G. M. Woodward, and later, with his son George. (See also G.S. Tregear.) He also etched and designed lottery tickets and the song-heads of musical scores.

Cruikshank died of alcohol poisoning at the age of forty-six as a result of a drinking contest, of which he was declared the winner. He is buried near his home in London.

 Caricature prominence 

During the late 18th century, there was propaganda due to political turbulence in Europe, in particular the French Revolution. The British monarchy was being criticized for debauchery during this time, as it was a period of economic hardship and debt. Political caricature and graphic satire became a prominent outlet for mass propaganda to express competing perspectives on political and economic issues. The revolution triggered feelings and expressions of patriotism towards artists' home countries which they depicted by shedding a grotesque light on their countries' enemies.

Isaac Cruikshank, James Gillray, and Thomas Rowlandson were considered the leading caricaturists during this period, and they produced many popular sketches and graphics satirizing contemporary issues. These three prominent artists' distinct styles and subject matter became notable and widespread throughout Europe, although they also adapted and borrowed images from lesser-known artists. The three illustrators were sometimes considered rivals as their ideas often took opposing positions on important matters, despite sometimes collaborating on works. A common theme in all three artists' works was the portrayal of gluttony and cannibalism meant to represent the exploitation of the people by the monarchy, sparked by the effects on the economy of France of the Revolution. Their work, however, had to be published exclusively in Britain, as in France censorship laws were at an all-time high.

In 1803 after France declared war on Britain, numerous patriotic prints resulted focused around support and strength for the British homefront. Cruikshank was one of the first to illustrate Napoleon as a negative caricature in his work Buonaparte at Rome Giving Audience in State (1797). In 1809, Cruikshank created French Generals Receiving an English Charge which largely attacked Prince Frederick, Duke of York for his scandalous affairs with Mary Anne Clarke during the time.

Legacy
A contemporary of James Gillray and Thomas Rowlandson, Cruikshank was part of what has been called "the Golden Age of British Caricature." Some have called his work "uneven" but at its best, it provided a vivid insight into the cultural and political preoccupations of the British during the decades at the turn of the nineteenth century. He was an avid and skilled water colourist, and had a "keen sense of humour", although his achievements during his shortened life suffered from the greater successes and "more prolonged career of his gifted son."

There are believed to be at least 345 prints created by Isaac Cruikshank between 1793 and 1800 that are in the British Museum's collection. E.B. Crumbier created a catalogue of around 1350 images that Cruikshank produced in his lifetime. In the Huntington Library, California, there is also a collection of his watercolour drawings.

Cruikshank, like his son Isaac Robert Cruikshank and more famous son George Cruikshank, was a pioneer in the history of comics through creating several cartoons which make use of narrative sequences and/or speech balloons.

Examples of his work

 References 

Sources

 
 
  

 Further reading 
The British Museum, the Huntington Library in California, and The Houghton Library at Harvard University all have significant holdings of Cruikshank's work.
George, Mary Dorothy. Hogarth to Cruikshank: Social Change in Graphic Satire. 1967.
Nygren, Edward J., ed. Isaac Cruikshank and the Politics of Parody: Watercolors in the Huntington Collection. University of California Press, 2005. ; 
Patten, Robert L.. "Cruikshank , Isaac (1764–1811)." Oxford Dictionary of National Biography''. Ed. H. C. G. Matthew and Brian Harrison. Oxford: OUP, 2004. 11 May 2007.

External links 

Cruikshank's work at the National Portrait Gallery
Isaac Cruikshank at Artcyclopedia
Isaac Cruikshank - Cartoons
Connected Histories: British History Sources, 1500-1900 This Jisc-funded web service provides federated searching of online historical resources for research. The web link provides access to primary sources which refer to Isaac Cruikshank.

Scottish illustrators
Scottish editorial cartoonists
Scottish caricaturists
Scottish comics artists
Scottish satirists
Scottish male painters
Artists from Edinburgh
1764 births
1811 deaths
Alcohol-related deaths in England